The National Institute of Epidemiology (NIE) is a medical research organisation located in Chennai, Tamil Nadu. NIE conducts research including interventional studies, disease modelling and health systems, conducts epidemiological investigations and clinical trials of traditional remedies.

Academics
NIE has been conducting MPH (Epidemiology and Health Systems) programme of the Sree Chitra Thirunal Institute of Medical Sciences and Technology. The Institute is also recognised by the University of Madras for research leading to Ph.D. degrees in the areas of epidemiology and bio-statistics.

References

External links
 Official website

1999 establishments in Tamil Nadu
Research institutes established in 1999
Research institutes in Chennai
Medical research institutes in India
Indian Council of Medical Research
Colleges affiliated to University of Madras